Booneville is a home rule-class city in Owsley County, Kentucky, in the United States. The population was 81 at the 2010 census. It is the county seat of Owsley County. It is located at the junction of Kentucky Route 11 and Kentucky Route 30 on the South Fork of the Kentucky River.

History
The town was originally named Moore's Station after its chief landowner. It was renamed Boone's Station and then Booneville in honor of the American frontiersman, Daniel Boone. The town, consisting at the time of little more than a temporary log courthouse, became the county seat when Owsley County was formed on May 20, 1844. From this, the settlement was also sometimes known as Owsley Court House around this time. It was formally incorporated as a city by the state assembly on March 1, 1847. During the Civil War, Booneville was a crossroads for various Union and Confederate regiments, and was threatened by Confederate guerrillas, but avoided the destruction that befell some other county seats of Kentucky during the war.

The Moyers Building in Boonesville was added to the National Register of Historic Places in 1982.

Geography

Demographics

As of the 2010 United States Census, there were 81 people living in the city. The racial makeup of the city was 100.0% White.

As of the census of 2000, there were 111 people, 50 households, and 36 families living in the city. The racial makeup of the city was 99.10% White, and 0.90% from two or more races.

There were 50 households, out of which 26.0% had children under the age of 18 living with them, 60.0% were married couples living together, 12.0% had a female householder with no husband present, and 28.0% were non-families. 28.0% of all households were made up of individuals, and 16.0% had someone living alone who was 65 years of age or older. The average household size was 2.22 and the average family size was 2.67.

In the city, the population was spread out, with 18.9% under the age of 18, 6.3% from 18 to 24, 24.3% from 25 to 44, 29.7% from 45 to 64, and 20.7% who were 65 years of age or older. The median age was 45 years. For every 100 females, there were 91.4 males. For every 100 females age 18 and over, there were 95.7 males.

The median income for a household in the city was $15,833, and the median income for a family was $17,500. Males had a median income of $36,250 versus $31,250 for females. The per capita income for the city was $8,252. There were 40.0% of families and 57.6% of the population living below the poverty line, including 92.7% of under eighteen and 11.8% of those over 64.

Government and politics
Mayor Charles E. Long, in office from 1959 to his death in 2019, was one of the longest-serving mayors in US history.

Education
Booneville has a lending library, the Owsley County Public Library.

References

External links
City website

 

Cities in Owsley County, Kentucky
County seats in Kentucky
Populated places established in 1847
1847 establishments in Kentucky
Cities in Kentucky